Tinjis (also called Tinga, and also spelled as Tingis) was a Libyan queen as the wife of King Antaeus in Berber and Greek mythology, and some kind of a female deity.

Family 
Tinjis' husband was the son of Poseidon and Gaia. Tinjis bore Antaeus daughters named Alceis or Barce and probably Iphinoe who mothered Palaemon by the hero Heracles.

Mythology
The historian and archaeologist Mustapha Ouachi noticed that the city Tangier is geographically related to its myth. The mother of Antaeus was the goddess of the Earth whereas the father of Antaeus was Poseidon who was the god of the sea, according to the Libyan legend. In addition, Herodotus considered Poseidon to be an ancient Libyan god that was adopted by the ancient Greeks, like Athena.

According to Plutarch, the Amazigh believed that Heracles consorted with Tinjis after the death of Antaeus and that Heracles and Tinjis were the parents of Sufax. According to their myth, Sufax built the city "Tangier" (which was known as Tingis in the ancient sources) and named it after his mother.

In fact, Tangier is believed to have been built by Berbers. It was an important city in an early short-lived kingdom known as Mauretania. The name of Sufax, mythical king and founder of Tangier, is similar to that of Syphax, king of the Masaesyli tribe of western Numidia.

Notes

External links
Plutarch, The Parallel Lives: The Life of Sertorius

Women of Heracles
Women in Greek mythology
Libyan characters in Greek mythology
Berber goddesses
Tangier